A by-election was held for the New South Wales Legislative Assembly electorate of West Macquarie on 21 December 1859 because John McPhillamy resigned.

Dates

Result

John McPhillamy resigned.

See also
Electoral results for the district of West Macquarie
List of New South Wales state by-elections

References

1859 elections in Australia
New South Wales state by-elections
1850s in New South Wales